Life Rolls On is the fifth and final studio album by American country music duo Florida Georgia Line. It was released on February 12, 2021 through BMLG Records. It includes the hit singles "I Love My Country" and "Long Live", as well the material from their 6-Pack EP. The album marks their only full-length release with producer Corey Crowder, a departure from their previous work with longtime producer Joey Moi.

Background 
Florida Georgia Line appeared on the May 18 episode of Songland. Two days later, on May 20, 2020, they released the 6-Pack EP, which included the song Second Guessing, which had won the Songland episode. All six songs from the EP are included on Life Rolls On. On December 4, 2020, the album and its release date were announced in a tweet.

Touring 
While a tour for the album, the I Love My Country Tour, was planned, it was cancelled in August of 2021, with the COVID-19 pandemic cited as the reason. However, Bob Lefsetz asserted in his newsletter that the actual reason was low ticket sales.

Accolades 
Life Rolls On was nominated for Top Country Album at the 2022 Billboard Music Awards.

Track listing

Personnel 
Credits adapted from Tidal and the album's liner notes.

Florida Georgia Line
 Brian Kelley – vocals, producer ; background vocals 
 Tyler Hubbard – vocals, producer

Additional musicians

 David Garcia – acoustic guitar, programming 
 Ilya Toshinskiy – acoustic guitar , mandolin , banjo 
 Todd Lombardo – banjo , acoustic guitar , mandolin , electric guitar 
 Jimmie Lee Sloas – bass guitar 
 Jerry Roe – drums , percussion 
 Derek Wells – electric guitar , Dobro 
 Dave Cohen – Hammond B-3 organ , synthesizer , keyboards 
 Corey Crowder – programming , synthesizer , background vocals 
 Jaren Johnston – background vocals, bass guitar, electric guitar 
 Katlin Owen – electric guitar 
 Alex Wright – Hammond B-3 organ , piano , synthesizer , keyboards , programming 
 Jake Rose – acoustic guitar, banjo, programming 
 Ross Copperman – programming 
 Josh Thompson – background vocals 
 Jordan Schmidt – programming 
 Jeff Gitelman – programming 
 Andrew DeRoberts – guitar, programming 
 Tony Lucido – bass guitar 
 Tyler Chiarelli – electric guitar 
 Alysa Vanderheym – piano, programming, synthesizer 

Technical

 Corey Crowder – producer, editor, recording engineer
 Jeff Juliano – mixer
 Adam Ayan – mastering engineer
 Jake Rose – recording engineer 
 Jeff Gitelman – producer 
 Priscilla Renea – producer 
 Andrew DeRoberts – producer 
 Jordan Schmidt – producer 
 Joe Baldridge – recording engineer 
 Jeff Balding – recording engineer 
 Ally Gecewicz – editor 
 Derek Wells – editor 
 Eivind Nordland – editor 
 Scott Cooke – editor 
 David Cook – editor , assistant mixer 
 Josh Ditty – assistant recording engineer

Charts

Weekly charts

Year-end charts

Release history

References

2021 albums
Florida Georgia Line albums
Big Machine Records albums